Bishop Auckland is a railway station that serves the market town of Bishop Auckland in County Durham, North East England,  north-west of Darlington. The station is the Western terminus of the Tees Valley Line, which links it to  via . It is owned by Network Rail and managed by Northern Trains.

History

Opening 
Bishop Auckland gained its first rail link in 1842, when the Stockton and Darlington Railway (S&DR) backed Bishop Auckland & Weardale Railway (BA&WR) gained the powers via an Act of Parliament to build a railway line from the S&DR's station at  via Bishop Auckland and Witton-le-Wear into Crook, County Durham.

The company initially built a temporary terminus at South Church, which opened on 19 April 1842. A road coach service then extended the service into Bishop Auckland, and a secondary road coach service also ran to Rainton Meadows. After completion of the Shildon tunnel, the BA&WR erected a permanent station on the current site, which opened to freight on 8 November 1843, and passengers on 30 January 1843. All operations were sub-leased as agreed to the S&DR.

Early developments 
In 1845, the S&DR came to an agreement with the Derwent Iron Company to sub-lease the southern section of the former Stanhope & Tyne Railway.

With all works again undertaken by the S&DR, this line opened on 3 August 1847. After these works had been completed, the BA&WR amalgamated with the WXR. All service were operated by the S&DR, which officially took over the new company in January 1857.

However, the S&DR and NER quickly came to the agreement of development of a joint station in the town, and so rebuilt the existing former BA&WR station, with NER trains using it from December 1857.

Between Eastgate and Westgate at Cambo Keels, sidings were established to serve the Weardale Iron Company's Heights limestone quarry, which is still in operation today. This final extension of the Weardale Railway bought about the final and largest layout of Bishop Auckland railway station, which was now rebuilt in triangular form with four platforms in 1905. Only three of these were normally used for passenger trains, with platform 1 handling trains towards Crook and Wearhead, and platforms 2 and 3 dealing with services on the Barnard Castle, Ferryhill and Durham lines. Platform 4 (on the chord linking the Durham & Crook lines) was mostly used for parcels & newspaper traffic and for racing pigeon specials.

Decline 
As elsewhere the UK, rail traffic in the area declined after World War II, with the Wearhead branch the first to lose its passenger trains in 1953. The principal closures came in the 1960s mainly as a result of the Beeching cuts, with services to: Barnard Castle via West Auckland ending in June 1962; Durham in May 1964; and Crook in March 1965. This left only the former original S&DR line to  line in operation, along with the freight-only branch traffic to Eastgate. In 1976, the disused platform was reinstated avoiding need for passengers to use a footbridge.

The station remained more or less intact (although increasingly forlorn and run-down) for more than 20 years thereafter, though by the early 1980s only the former platform 3 was in use (along with the former Bishop Auckland East signal box).  It was eventually replaced by the current structure on 6 June 1986. This stands on the site of the former Crook branch platform, on a siding off the now single 'main' line which continues on towards Stanhope and Eastgate. The signal box was abolished at the same time, with neighbouring Shildon box assuming control of the much-simplified layout.

The remaining station buildings were then demolished and the site sold off for retail redevelopment. The former goods yard is now a supermarket with carpark, and the Durham platform is now the site of a cycling and motoring store and a bank.

The station today 

The station is currently operated by Northern, which provides National Rail passenger services. In 2012, Bishop Trains adopted the station from Northern Rail (the operator at the time), providing a National Rail Ticket Office and staff for the station. Bishop Trains have further developed the Ticket Office and now provide a booking service for coach trips and holidays, and more recently, rail charters.  It is staffed six days per week throughout the year (Monday to Saturday 06:50-16:15).  At all other times, tickets must be purchased in advance or on the train.  Service running information is offered by timetable posters and Bishop Trains staff (when open).  Step-free access is available from the main entrance to the ticket office and platform.

In 2014, the station was revamped. In the former toilet block, a glass front waiting room was constructed, alongside a new toilet and office.

Stationmasters

William Crawford 1843–1886 
William Boyne ?–1895
Matthew William Seymour 1895–1907 (afterwards station master at Darlington)
Robert Cocks 1908–1920  (formerly station master at Monkwearouth)
J.C. Pigg  1920–1921 (afterwards station master at Durham)
J.R. Winter 1922–?
A. Howe 1934–?

Services
As of the May 2021 timetable change, the station is served by an hourly return service to  via  and  operated by Northern Trains.

Rolling stock used: Class 156 Super Sprinter and Class 158 Express Sprinter

Bishop Auckland West

The station was built by the Weardale Railway and initially opened on 23 May 2010, with a regular passenger service which lasted until the end of the 2012 running season.

Thus, from July 2018, two of the three daily return services between Stanhope and Witton-le-Wear have been extended to Bishop Auckland West.

As the name suggests, the station is located a short distance to the West of the National Rail station.

References

Sources

Further reading

External links 
 
 

Railway stations in County Durham
DfT Category F1 stations
Former North Eastern Railway (UK) stations
Railway stations in Great Britain opened in 1843
Northern franchise railway stations
Railway station
1843 establishments in England